The 1952 Arizona State Sun Devils football team was an American football team that represented Arizona State College (later renamed Arizona State University) in the Border Conference during the 1952 college football season. In their first season under head coach Clyde B. Smith, the Sun Devils compiled a 6–3 record (4–0 against Border opponents) and outscored their opponents by a combined total of 247 to 121.

Schedule

References

Arizona State
Arizona State Sun Devils football seasons
Border Conference football champion seasons
Arizona State Sun Devils football